Agiak Lagoon is a lake in North Slope Borough, Alaska, in the United States.

The name Agiak, derived from an Eskimo word meaning "file", was applied to the lagoon because it contains a bar which resembles a file.

References

Lakes of Alaska
Bodies of water of North Slope Borough, Alaska